Toppazzini is an Italian surname. Notable people with the surname include:

 Jerry Toppazzini (1931–2012), Canadian ice hockey player
 Zellio Toppazzini (1930–2001), Canadian ice hockey player

Italian-language surnames